Einar Emanuelsson (born April 3, 1997) is a Swedish professional ice hockey player. He is currently playing with Luleå HF of the Swedish Hockey League (SHL).

Emanuelsson played his first game with Luleå HF during the 2013-14 European Trophy playoffs, and made his Swedish Hockey League regular season debut during the 2014–15 SHL season.

References

External links

1997 births
Living people
Luleå HF players
Swedish ice hockey forwards